Cimadevilla is a surname. Notable people with the surname include:

Francisco Cimadevilla, Puerto Rican journalist
Jorge Cimadevilla (born 1965), American football player
Mario Cimadevilla (born 1954), Argentine politician